Lee Ga-ryeong is a South Korean actress and model. She is known for her roles in dramas such as Apgujeong Midnight Sun, The Gentlemen of Wolgyesu Tailor Shop, and Monster. She is best known for her role in drama Love (ft. Marriage and Divorce) as Boo Hye-ryung.

Filmography

Television series

Television shows

Ambassadorship 
 Public Relations Ambassador for the 5th Ulsan Short Film Festival (2022)

Awards and nominations

References

External links
 
 

1980 births
Living people
21st-century South Korean actresses
South Korean female models
South Korean television actresses